The 2011 European Junior Judo Championships is an edition of the European Junior Judo Championships, organised by the European Judo Union.It was held in Lommel, Belgium from 16 to 18 September 2011.

Medal summary

Medal table

Men's events

Women's events

Source Results

References

External links
 

 U21
European Junior Judo Championships
European Championships, U21
Judo competitions in Belgium
Judo
Judo, World Championships U21